The Steyr MPi 69 is a 9×19mm submachine gun of the late 20th century made by the Austrian firm Steyr.

Characteristics
The MPi 69 is shaped much like other telescoping bolt submachineguns, such as the MAC 10 or Uzi.  It has a vertical pistol handgrip into which the magazine is inserted, and a longer horizontal front grip area; it also has a folding stock.

Featuring a design unusual among modern submachine guns, the MPi 69 is cocked by a dual-purpose lever also used as the front sling attachment point. The forward handgrip and vertical pistol handgrip are all one large plastic molding, forming the front and center bottom part of the weapon.  The receiver proper is a square metal tube which partly nestles inside the plastic handgrip.

Production status
In 1990, the MPi 81 was replaced by the TMP in the product line, though the TMP was also discontinued by Steyr, which sold the design to Brügger & Thomet; it was subsequently improved as the Brügger & Thomet MP9.

Variants

MPi 81
 The MPi 81 is a more modern, product improved version of the MPi 69 introduced in 1981.  It has a conventional cocking handle on the left side of the receiver and other minor improvements, including an increased firing rate of 700 rpm. A "Loop Hole" model meant to function as a port firing weapon was also made, fitted with an AUG optic and a longer barrel with a fitting for a firing port.

Users

Malaysia used by Special Actions Unit and F Team Special Branch in mid 1970s

See also
 ENARM SMG
 PM-84 Glauberyt
 Ruger MP9
 Uzi

References

Bibliography

External links
 Modern Firearms

Submachine guns of Austria
Telescoping bolt submachine guns
9mm Parabellum submachine guns